Blondie 4(0) Ever is a double album by American rock band Blondie. It was released on May 12, 2014, by Noble ID in celebration of the band's 40th anniversary. The two-disc package consists of Greatest Hits Deluxe Redux, a collection of re-recordings of Blondie's past singles, and the band's tenth studio album, Ghosts of Download. The latter spawned three singles: "A Rose by Any Name", "Sugar on the Side", and "I Want to Drag You Around".

Background and recording
Blondie began working on their tenth studio album shortly after the release of Panic of Girls (2011). In early March 2013, the band announced via Facebook and Twitter that they were putting finishing touches to new music, and it would be released later that year. The album was recorded at Mercy Sound Studios in New York City and at Skyline Studios in Oakland, California. Guitarist and co-founder Chris Stein announced that the album would feature collaborations with girl group Stush, hip hop group Los Rakas, and Colombian electronica artist Systema Solar. On June 18, the group announced through Facebook that they were still recording but almost finished, while revealing that their next album would be titled Ghosts of Download. Stein stated in August that an EDM collaboration with Hector Fonseca would be included on the album.

"We have live performances on there that bring out the style of Blondie", Debbie Harry told Classic Rock. "I don't think it sounds entirely like a dance record... We did this in a very economical way, actually. Chris [Stein] and Matt did all of their work on computer, then we would send files to people and they would play to it, or sing to it, or write to it, or whatever. So it was kind of in the ghostly era of electronics."

"This project was ongoing since we finished Panic of Girls", Stein commented. "It's been like two years that I have been working on this. This one is more computer-based than the last record, which was more band-based. A lot of the programmed parts remained on the record, more so than the previous records. I spent a lot of time doing this at home, and then sending things back and forth with our producer Jeff Saltzman. He helped develop melodies with me, and that was really gratifying. And he had this assistant, Natalie Hawkins, who helped with the melodies too. There was a lot of collaboration with this record, more so than previous records, except perhaps for Autoamerican which had a lot of outside players on it, even an orchestra."

Harry also commented, "It's always the music; the music is the primary inspiration. Every piece has its own mood, its own arc and a lot of times the lyrics sort of suggest themselves."

"Oh, with Debbie, we just have a lot of unsaid communication, a lot of non-verbal stuff goes on. I don't have to ask her much because she will always have the same conclusions", Stein said. Harry agreed: "Most recently, there were a couple of lines in a song that he came up with, and then there were two more lines that had to be written, and I had already written them. So I mean, it just sort of happens. It's easy for us."

Release
The title of Blondie's tenth studio album was confirmed to be Ghosts of Download on June 18, 2013. According to Stein, the title refers to "all spirits in the background of electricity and data". An early version of the track listing was unveiled on June 28 through Pandora, along with previews of the tracks.

The album's release was postponed several times. It was originally scheduled to be released in November 2013, but the release was pushed back to January 2014 in order to avoid the rush of albums released for the Christmas period. On December 31, 2013, Harry stated in an interview on CNN's New Year's Eve Live that the album would be released in March 2014. The January 2014 issue of British magazine Mojo confirmed the album's release date as March 17, 2014, to be supplemented with Blondie's 40th Anniversary World Wide Tour. However, the release was ultimately delayed to May 13, 2014.

It was announced in the February 2014 issue of Vanity Fair magazine, for which Harry was photographed by Annie Leibovitz, that Ghosts of Download would be released as part of a two-disc package titled Blondie 4(0) Ever—coinciding with the band's 40th anniversary—which would also include an album of the band's greatest hits.

The first song released from Blondie 4(0) Ever was the re-recorded version on "Sunday Girl", which appeared on the soundtrack album to the 2013 film CBGB.

The final track listing for Blondie 4(0) Ever was revealed in late March 2014 on Pandora. The first disc, Greatest Hits Deluxe Redux, features brand-new studio recordings of 11 of Blondie's commercially successful singles, except "Maria", which appears in its original 1999 version. 
The deluxe edition includes the two-disc set, a DVD of Blondie's 1977 live performance at CBGB, a concert poster from 1979, and five postcards of Stein photos. Three additional Ghosts of Download bonus tracks were made available upon pre-ordering the digital album via iTunes and/or Amazon. The iTunes pre-order also included an instant free download of the song "I Want to Drag You Around".

Artwork
The artwork for Ghosts of Download was designed by J. H. Williams III, who has previously worked for DC Comics and also created the cover art for the singles "A Rose by Any Name" and "Sugar on the Side". A high-quality version of the cover, with text reading "Blondie Ghosts of Download", was released to iTunes and Amazon at the end of April 2014. Further pages from the booklet (created by Williams) of the album, containing handwritten lyrics for select songs by members of the band, accompanied by skeletal images of them, were posted on Williams' website on April 22, 2014.

Promotion
On March 20, 2013, Harry and Stein stopped by the talk show Soundcheck on WNYC 93.9 FM to premiere the track "Make a Way". The band embarked on the Blast Off Tour across Europe from June 11 to July 10, 2013. The band performed six songs from the album: "Rave", "A Rose by Any Name", "Take Me in the Night", "Winter", "I Want to Drag You Around", and "Sugar on the Side". Prior to this, Harry and Stein appeared on BBC One's The One Show to promote the new album and the Blast Off Tour, with Stein saying that he felt the new tracks were the best yet.

"A Rose by Any Name" was released on June 21, 2013, as the lead single from Ghosts of Download in Europe. On June 18, Blondie announced their North American No Principals Tour for fall 2013. Each ticket purchased for the tour included five tracks from the album: "Make a Way", "I Want to Drag You Around", "Can't Stop Wanting", "A Rose by Any Name", and "I Screwed Up". However, some fans received "Sugar on the Side" instead of "A Rose by Any Name". The song "Mile High" was debuted during the later shows of the tour.

On October 24, 2013, Harry appeared on the Project Runway All Stars (season 3) season 3 premiere as a guest judge, and the song "Sugar on the Side" debuted on the show's Twitter account during the episode. The track was later released on December 17, 2013, as the album's second single in North America.

The album's third single, "I Want to Drag You Around", made its world premiere on BBC Radio 2's The Ken Bruce Show on April 3, 2014. It was also named "Record of the Week" on BBC Radio 2 for the week beginning April 21, 2014. A lyric video for the song, featuring J. H. Williams III's graphics for the album, was uploaded to the band's official YouTube page on April 23. The official audios for "Sugar on the Side" (from Ghosts of Download) and the reworked version of "One Way or Another" (from Greatest Hits Deluxe Redux) were uploaded to YouTube on April 22, 2014, to promote the album. The official music video for "Sugar on the Side", directed by photographer Rankin, debuted exclusively on Hunger TV on April 30, 2014. The album itself became "Record of the Week" on BBC Radio 2 for the week beginning May 5, 2014, meaning that one song from the album was played each day on BBC Radio 2. From May 5 to 9, The Guardian streamed tracks from Ghosts of Download daily on its website via SoundCloud.

The band recorded a session at the BBC's Maida Vale Studios for the BBC Two show Newsnight on May 13, 2014, featuring new and older songs. On the same day, the band appeared on Good Morning America to perform "Sugar on the Side". Blondie also performed "Sugar on the Side" and "One Way or Another" on The Daily Show on May 14, followed by a performance of "Heart of Glass" on Live! with Kelly and Michael on May 19.

On May 24, 2014, the band embarked on a world tour in support of Blondie 4(0) Ever, including dates across North America and Europe. The tour commenced at the Tropicana Casino & Resort Atlantic City in Atlantic City, New Jersey, and concluded on October 3, 2014, at Harrah's Resort Southern California in Valley Center, California.

Commercial performance

Blondie 4(0) Ever entered the US Billboard 200 at number 109, selling 3,000 copies in its first week. The album debuted at number 16 on the UK Albums Chart with first-week sales of 4,148 copies. On occasion of Blondie's co-headlining Australia and New Zealand tour with Cyndi Lauper in April 2017, the album reached number six on the New Zealand Heatseeker Albums chart.

Track listing

Notes
  Despite not being credited as songwriters of "A Rose by Any Name" in the album's liner notes, Deborah Harry, Chris Stein, and Jamie Siegel are listed as songwriters by ASCAP.
  signifies an additional producer
 "Relax" was omitted from the vinyl edition of the album.

Personnel
Credits adapted from the liner notes of Blondie 4(0) Ever.

Greatest Hits Deluxe Redux

 Kato Khandwala – production 
 Mark Needham – mixing
 Craig Leon – production 
 Ryan Ewing – additional cover treatment
 Trevor Niemann – design, layout
 Chris Stein – photos

Ghosts of Download

 Jeff Saltzman – production 
 Chris Stein – production 
 Hernan Santiago – mixing 
 Paul David Hager – mixing 
 Mikael Johnston – mixing 
 Marcussen Mastering – mastering
 J. H. Williams III – art direction, design
 Systema Solar – featured artist 
 Miss Guy – featured artist 
 Beth Ditto – featured artist 
 Matt Katz-Bohen – production 
 Jeremy Scherer – additional production 
 Jamie Siegel – additional production 
 Joe Tomino – additional production 
 Conrad Kaneshiro – additional production 
 Natalie Hawkins – additional vocals 
 Los Rakas – featured artist 
 Keliah Baez – featured artist 
 Felicia Dennis – featured artist 
 Keisha Williams – featured artist 
 Archie Ekong – additional production, programming 
 Hector Fonseca – additional vocals

Charts

Certifications

Release history

References

2014 greatest hits albums
Blondie (band) compilation albums
Caroline Records compilation albums